State Route 77 (or SR 77) is a state highway in Arizona that traverses much of the state's length, stretching from its northern terminus at the boundary of the Navajo Nation north of Holbrook to its junction with I-10 in Tucson.

Route description

At its southern terminus, north of Tucson, the road is known as Oracle Road until the final mile and a half when the road turns westward directly toward Interstate 10 and is called Miracle Mile Road, named such in 1962.

Past the Navajo Nation boundary, SR 77 becomes BIA Route 6 northbound towards Keams Canyon.  Between Show Low and Globe, this highway is concurrent with U.S. Route 60.  Its southernmost reaches were formerly part of U.S. Route 80 and U.S. Route 89, except for its terminal segment, the Miracle Mile segment of old Business 10 and State Route 84.

Origin of the name of Tucson's Miracle Mile

Although it was thought for several years that Tucson's Miracle Mile derived its name from a June 1937 Arizona Highways magazine, historian David Leighton challenged this theory, in a February 23, 2015, article in the Arizona Daily Star newspaper. He explained that in 1936, real estate developer Stanley Williamson conceived the idea of creating a commercial center outside of the over-congested downtown retail district, in Tucson. His model for this business center was the Miracle Mile in Los Angeles, California. The one in Los Angeles was the idea of real estate agent A.W. Ross, who saw that the retail district in that city was overcrowded and that cars were becoming more common. He came up with the idea of buying farming land along Wilshire Boulevard, several miles out from downtown, with the belief that as more people bought automobiles, they would be willing to drive farther to avoid the lack of parking and congestion in the downtown area. While initially no one thought his idea would work, in time store after store came to his business center. The Miracle Mile eventually became one of Los Angeles' premier shopping districts. Ross originally called his business area the Wilshire Boulevard Center; it was changed to the Miracle Mile in 1928.

History
SR 77 was first designated on May 13, 1930. The highway originally ran from a junction with SR 73 in McNary to U.S. Route 66 (US 66) in Holbrook via Show Low. On June 20, 1938, the section of SR 77 between Show Low and McNary was decommissioned, following the completion of US 60 from Globe to Springerville through Show Low. SR 77 was then extended southwest along the brand new US 60 to Globe, followed by a further southeast extension along US 70 from Globe to Cutter at the San Carlos Indian Reservation. From Cutter, SR 77 was extended further south along a newly acquired state highway to a southern terminus with US 80/US 89 in Oracle Junction. At the time, both U.S. Highways made up the route between Tucson and Oracle Junction.

US 80 was removed from the Tucson to Oracle Junction corridor in 1977, when the U.S. Highway was truncated to I-10 in Benson. On August 21, 1992, US 89 was truncated to US 180 in Flagstaff. At the same time, the northern Tucson section of the Interstate 10 Business Loop (I-10 Business) was decommissioned. I-10 Business started at an intersection with I-10 and Miracle Mile, heading east on Miracle Mile to US 89, then followed US 89 south on Oracle to its terminus at a junction with US 89, I-10, and I-19 Business in South Tucson, Arizona. SR 77 was immediately extended south along former US 89 down Oracle Road to Miracle Mile in Tucson, then extended west along Miracle Mile (which was part of the recently decommissioned I-10 Business) to an interchange with I-10. While Miracle Mile and the northern segment of Oracle Road were renumbered as an extension of SR 77, the remainder of I-10 Business and US 89 between the intersection of Oracle Road and Miracle Mile and the interchange with I-10 and I-19 Business were not given to another route and was retired as a state highway, being handed over to the city of Tucson on October 15, 1993.

Junction list

See also

Notes

References

External links

 SR 77 at Arizona Roads
 David Leighton,"Street Smarts: Miracle Mile's roots include fancy stores, the Mexican revolution," Arizona Daily Star, February 23, 2015

077
1077
1077
Transportation in Pima County, Arizona
Transportation in Pinal County, Arizona
Transportation in Gila County, Arizona
Transportation in Navajo County, Arizona
Transportation in Tucson, Arizona
Geography of the Navajo Nation
U.S. Route 80
U.S. Route 89
Interstate 10